Van Mourik is a Dutch toponymic surname meaning "from Maurik", a town in Gelderland. The variant Van Maurik retains the original spelling. People with this name include:

Colin van Mourik (born 1985), Dutch football defender
Ger van Mourik (1931–2017), Dutch football defender
Guusje van Mourik (born 1955), Dutch karateka, judoka and boxer
Justus van Maurik (1846–1904), Dutch author and cigar maker

References

Dutch-language surnames
Toponymic surnames